}}

Macmillan Education is a publisher of English Language teaching and school curriculum materials. The company is based in London and operates in over 120 countries worldwide.

History
In 2011 Macmillan Publishers Ltd was fined GBP 11.3 million by the High Court in London, in respect of gains through corruption by Macmillan Education in East and West Africa between 2002 and 2009. Subsequently, Macmillan Education stopped operating in East and West Africa. In December 2011, Bedford, Freeman, and Worth Publishing Group, Macmillan's higher education group, changed its name to Macmillan Higher Education while retaining the Bedford, Freeman, and Worth name for its K–12 educational unit.

Until 2015, when it was merged into Springer Nature, Macmillan Education was a division of Macmillan Publishers Ltd, a wholly owned subsidiary of Holtzbrinck Publishing Group.  Holtzbrinck retains a majority interest in Springer Nature.

References

External links

Educational publishing companies
English-language education